Ryan Sinclair is a fictional character created by Chris Chibnall and portrayed by Tosin Cole in the long-running British science fiction television series Doctor Who. Introduced in the first episode of Series 11, Ryan was a companion of Jodie Whittaker's Thirteenth Doctor until the 2021 New Year's Special "Revolution of the Daleks".

Character biography

Early life 
Ryan Sinclair was born in 1999 or late 1998. As a child, he attended Redlands Primary alongside Yasmin Khan and was placed in a class named after Rosa Parks.

In 2012, when he was thirteen, his mother died from a heart attack, with Ryan being the one to find her body. After his mother's death, Ryan's relationship with his father soured to the point of parental abandonment. He began to feel that he wasn't deserving of his father's love. Ryan was then raised by his paternal grandmother, Grace.

Young adult life 
Ryan suffered the effects of racism and noted that he was stopped more often by the police than his white peers. Ryan once went on a messy holiday to Crete with his mates. Ryan worked in a warehouse for SportStack, with one of his main jobs being packing trainers for delivery. Due to his dyspraxia, Ryan's first month on the job was a "total nightmare" for him, as he struggled to do things physically. Fortunately, he found friends who helped him, and he was able to master his way around the packing area. At one point while on the job, Ryan rode the warehouse conveyor belt, leading to him getting a sprained ankle, and a "final warning" from his superiors.

In 2015, Grace married Graham O'Brien. Despite her wishes that Ryan consider Graham his granddad, he did not accept Grace's husband as family.

In 2017, Ryan was visited by his father, but the encounter ended poorly after Ryan "got mad" at his father for constantly missing out on his life.

Meeting the Doctor 
In September 2018, whilst trying to learn to cycle with Grace and Graham, Ryan fell off and threw the bicycle away into the nearby woods out of anger. After his grandmother and Graham left him to calm down, Ryan went to retrieve it.

Whilst retrieving it from a tree, he discovered a glowing symbol and, upon touching it, summoned a strange blue pod. He touched the pod only to find it freezing, burning his hand. Calling the police to investigate, Ryan was reunited with Yasmin Khan, a classmate from school who now worked as a police officer, when she arrived to investigate the scene. Ryan confessed it wasn't a prank, making Yasmin confirm such by touching the pod. Walking away, Ryan received a call from his grandmother asking for help on a nearby train.

The pair raced to the train, where they met the recently regenerated Thirteenth Doctor and were subsequently shocked by a coil creature. Ryan helped the Doctor track down the pod's occupant, Tim Shaw and prevented him from claiming Karl Wright as a trophy. However, Grace died via electrocution when disabling the gathering coil. Devastated, her death motivated Ryan to battle his dyspraxia in her honour. He later helped the Doctor make a teleport so she could reach her TARDIS only to be teleported with her into space.

Believing the pair to be bonuses in the Rally of the Twelve Galaxies, Angstrom scooped Ryan and Graham out of deep space and transported them aboard her ship.

On Desolation, he found Yasmin and the Doctor, who had been similarly saved by Epzo, Angstrom's rival in what would become the final stage of the rally. The rivals, with the Doctor and her friends in tow, were tasked by Ilin, master of the rally, to race across the planet; the first to reach the finish line at the Ghost Monument would win 3.2 million krin and salvation from planet's hostile surface. The Doctor discovered that the Ghost Monument was, in fact, her TARDIS, phasing in and out of reality. After the Doctor stabilised the TARDIS, Ryan entered it for the first time and the Doctor attempted to take them home.

Trying to return home 
Attempting to land the TARDIS back in 21st century Sheffield, Ryan saw singing waterfalls made of pink crystals, a unicorn sanctuary on a lost moon and the Big Bang happening in front of his eyes.

Eventually, the TARDIS had latched onto nearby Artron energy and landed in 1955 Montgomery, Alabama, exciting Ryan as it was his first time travel experience. However, when he tried to return a dropped glove to a passerby, Lizzie, he was slapped by her husband who threatened to lynch him should he disturb a white woman in Montgomery. After Rosa Parks helped to calm the man, she explained to Ryan that outsiders were not safe from racism in segregated US states and told him of the death of the northern Emmett Till in Mississippi. Later, Ryan was denied service at Slim's Bar and labelled a "negro", and had to discretely enter the "whites-only" Sahara Springs Motel. He had to enter through the back door of the buses and sit at the back. To learn more about Rosa, given he only knew about her defiant move which started the Montgomery Bus Boycott led by Martin Luther King, he followed her home and sat in on one of her annual meetings with other blacks campaigning for civil rights. There, he met King, astonishing him and explained how his grandmother Grace idolised the preacher.

Attempting to stop Krasko's plot to alter history, Ryan and Graham came to James Blake's fishing spot. Blake was shocked that the black Ryan was Graham's grandson and was told by Ryan of a staged event by black citizens in Montgomery that night, causing Blake to resume his place in history as the driver of Parks's bus. Later, he boarded Parks's bus to ensure it was crowded enough for whites to not be able to all sit at the front. He witnessed Parks refusing to move for the white passengers and her historic arrest. Back at the TARDIS, the Doctor told Ryan that Parks was honoured by President Clinton in 1999, which Ryan thought took too long. He was taken to see Asteroid 284996, also named Rosaparks, in space.

The Doctor managed to finally return Ryan and his friends home to Sheffield, only half an hour after they left, and before the Doctor could leave on her own, she and Ryan visited Yaz's flat for tea. Discovering a mysteriously quiet nearby flat that was infested with cobwebs, the arachnophobic Ryan discovered that giant spiders had begun attacking humans around Sheffield. Eventually, the source of the spiders was traced to the new hotel built by Jack Robertson that Yaz's mother, Najia Khan, was working at. As Ryan was forced to capture one of the smaller spiders, it was revealed that the hotel was built on the site of a former coal mine that was pumped up with toxic waste, causing the local spiders to mutate and grow much larger than normal. Ryan received a letter from his father asking to reconnect with him, but he did not approve and did not have enough time to process it before stumbling upon a large van-sized spider in the hotel's ballroom. Coming up with a plan, Ryan connected the entertainment system in Robertson's panic room to a grime music station and used the vibrations to lure the smallest ones in and trap them. However, Robertson shot the largest mother spider despite the Doctor's protests not to.

With the threat over, Ryan, Graham and Yaz met up outside the TARDIS and, after being allowed in, stated their intentions to willingly carry on travelling with the Doctor. With her christening their group as 'Team TARDIS', they all pulled a lever together to continue to further adventures.

Adventures with the Doctor 
Ryan and Team TARDIS travelled to the planet Gatan, arriving in the City of Radiant Stone in the midst of war. Ryan decided to climb to the roofs of the city to see what was causing the destruction, where he and Graham witnessed a robotic woman called Sandola Dell fly past and begin to commentate on the battle between Tumat and Kraytos. When he was spotted by Sandola, he attempted to argue with her, leading to him and Graham being teleported to her headquarters at the Freedom Thoughtcasting Network. After being briefly reunited with the Doctor on board, Ryan and Graham were locked up by Sandola in a disused dressing room. Learning of her struggles at work, the two convinced her to take some time off, leaving them alone. Learning they were in the room belonging to two actors who played Tumat and Kraytos for promotions, they used the powerful suits to break out and rescue the Doctor from being attacked by Berakka Dogbolter. They eventually used the suits to trick the real warriors onto a teleport pad where the Doctor fused them into one being, thereby ending the war.

When Team TARDIS travelled to the junk planet Seffilun 27 in search of spare parts in the 67th century, Graham accidentally set off a sonic mine that knocked them out for four days. Fortunately, the Tsuranga medical ship had been nearby when the mine detonated, and they were brought on board for treatment shortly after the blast, but without the TARDIS. As the Doctor found a way to get back, the ship was boarded by a Pting, which began to eat through the ship itself. Ryan and Yaz met Yoss, a man who was about to give birth, and felt his baby kicking before Ryan explained about his troubled history with his own father. With a plan forming, Ryan and Graham were forced to act as 'doulas' for Yoss and successfully delivered his baby. Safely arriving on the space station with the Pting jettisoned in the meantime, Ryan and his friends were able to return to the TARDIS.

In New York City in 1904, Ryan saw the Doctor escape from 200 cyborg clones of Harry Houdini in the subway.

The Doctor and her team were tasked with preventing the Genesis Seed stored in the secret Vault 13 within the Galactic Seed Vault from falling into the hands of Nightshade.

Ryan and Team TARDIS later travelled to Punjab in 1947 on Yaz's request to see her grandmother Umbreen when she was younger. They eventually met Umbreen and her husband-to-be Prem on the day before both their wedding and the Partition of India, where Prem's younger brother, Manish, wanted to separate Hindus and Muslims on the nearby border. However, they encountered two Thijarians who they believed were killing local people. Ryan, the Doctor and Prem investigated and accidentally ended up in their 'hive'. However, after escaping and trapping the Thijarians out of the area, the Doctor realised that they were simply bearing witness to the unacknowledged dead, with Prem next. Ryan watched as Umbreen and Prem got married, but when Manish's Hindu nationalists attempted to drive the Muslims out, Prem was shot by Manish. Ryan and his friends eventually returned to 2018 with history unchanged by their visit.

The Doctor's group next visited the Kerb!am warehouse on Kandoka's moon after the Doctor received a message for help on a packing slip she received. Ryan inspired the Doctor that they should take the roles of employees in the workforce, and he joined her in packing with Kira Arlo. After encountering the manager, Jarva Slade, Ryan, the Doctor and Yaz believed that the company's system had gone rogue and was making the small number of human workers vanish. However, when he discovered that Kira had gone missing, he led Yaz and their co-worker, Charlie Duffy, to the unmanned dispatch area via several conveyor belts.

After Kira died at the hands of a delivery robot, it was revealed that Charlie had intercepted all the company's parcels and turned their bubble wrap into bombs to kill their receivers and pin the blame on the automated system to let humans get more jobs. With the Doctor preventing the deliveries from going out but Charlie refusing to leave, the group teleported out before the warehouse could explode.

After attempting to arrive at Queen Elizabeth I's coronation, the Doctor accidentally brought Team TARDIS to Bilehurst Cragg in the early 17th century in the middle of a series of witch trials. After Mother Twiston was tried as a witch by the landlady, Becka Savage, the Doctor intervened, proclaiming her group to be witchfinders. Upon meeting King James I, the King took a shine to Ryan, and he and Graham were forced to stick with him and Becka. After Becka's younger cousin Willa was attacked by a tendril of mud while attempting to bury her grandmother, Ryan attempted to prevent them from killing anyone else while the Doctor and Yaz investigated, but the plan did not work, leading the group to encounter the others as the mud possessed the body of Mother Twiston.

Moving off to find a group of the mud figures, Ryan, Graham and Yaz eventually stumbled upon the Doctor getting ducked under suspicion as a witch. Although she survived, Becka revealed herself to be infected with the mud and transformed, now identifying as the Morax, whose prison disguised as a tree on Pendle Hill was broken by Becka, leading them to plan on releasing their king and filling up the planet with their form. After being briefly knocked out, everyone followed the Doctor to Pendle Hill, where they used burning torches constructed from the prison to seal the Morax again. Eventually, the group made King James promise that the events would never be recounted in the future and, turning down an offer to follow King James home to London, Ryan left in the TARDIS.

Team TARDIS next arrived at a pizza parlour in New Port City, where they discovered the body of Iz. Ryan and Yaz investigated Iz's home together. They discovered that the deceased Gornt was a brilliant artist, and found teleportation coordinates to a party Iz had attended outside the Grey Zone. Ryan and Yaz teleported to the party's location, but were instead kidnapped by Ronan Sumners, who planned to harvest their sperantium to power the city's teleportation system. However, they were saved by Graham and the Doctor, and Sumners was accidentally ported into a Pizza-Porter oven.

After helping the Doctor halt a war on the planet Lobos between the dog-like loba and human colonists, Ryan left his mobile phone there and asked to return for it. Accidentally, the TARDIS slipped almost six hundred years into the future, where the planet was now ruled by human zealots, served by slave loba. The zealots derived human superiority over loba from one joke by Graham, now worshipped as "the Good Doctor" while the real Doctor was forgotten. With women treated barely better than loba, Ryan and Yasmin were conflated into "St Rasmin", which gave Ryan a considerable authority. He befriended Brother Tempika from the Temple of Tordos, who turned out to work for the resistance. This helped the Doctor learn both sides of the story. In the end, the Doctor succeeded in uncovering the lie of the zealots, setting the record straight and brokering a lasting peace between humans and loba.

Making peace with his family 
Visiting 2018 Norway, the Doctor and friends discovered a strangely boarded-up and quiet cottage in the middle of nowhere. Exploring, they found a girl called Hanne hiding, terrified, as her father Erik had left her and she believed there was a monster in the nearby woods that took him. Despite not initially taking to each other well, Ryan was forced to stay with Hanne as the Doctor, Graham and Yaz entered some form of dimensional portal placed in a mirror upstairs in the house. Eventually, Ryan discovered there was no monster, just some recordings played to scare Hanne, and upon learning this, she escaped into the portal.

They ended up in an anti-zone, an area made to protect space-time, while the rest of the group had already reached the other side. Escaping, Hanne discovered the Solitract plane, a conscious alternate universe that was exiled at the beginning of time as it was incompatible with the main universe and was now seeking friends, creating figures of Hanne's mother, Trine, and Grace to attract Erik and Graham. However, Ryan was trapped in the anti-zone as the Solitract plane collapsed and just about managed to escape with the rest of the group when they reappeared. After saying goodbye to Hanne, Graham explained how he had met Grace again, and he and Ryan talked about how they both missed her. Ryan finally called him 'Granddad' in doing so, before returning to the TARDIS.

In the TARDIS, the Doctor discovered nine separate distress signals all coming from the planet Ranskoor Av Kolos, which they followed to meet a man called Greston Paltraki, a commander who had visited the planet to stop a threat there. They eventually discovered that he was being threatened by Tzim-Sha, the Stenza they met on their first adventure, over the safety of some strange mineral-shaped objects. Ryan and Graham were tasked with finding Paltraki's crew. Evading fire from SniperBots, Graham and Ryan discovered the rest of the crew held in Stenza stasis pods and attempted to get them out before they were attacked again.

As Tzim-Sha put his plan of using the local Ux's powers with his technology to stasis freeze entire planets, starting with Earth, Ryan began to lead the hostages to safety. He returned just as Graham was being faced down by Tzim-Sha, and distracted him long enough for Graham to weaken him. After finally fist-bumping Graham, the two locked Tzim-Sha in one of his own stasis pods. With the threat averted, the Ux decided to see the universe with Paltraki and the Doctor's group headed on their way.

Sometime later, Ryan and his friends were treated by the Doctor to witnessing nineteen New Year's Eve celebrations in a row from across history. Before reaching the twentieth, however, the Doctor was alerted to some non-terrestrial things attempting to come together in Sheffield. Landing at an archaeological dig site on New Year's Day 2019, Ryan met Lin and Mitch who had uncovered an ancient burial site when a massive squid-like creature briefly appeared. Trying to analyse the creature, Team TARDIS travelled to Graham's house where Ryan finally reunited with his father, Aaron. Ryan left to talk with him in a café as the rest of the group returned to the TARDIS.

Sat together, Ryan told his father exactly how lost and lonely he had been feeling ever since he left and how he had let him down and hidden when he was needed, although Aaron refused to hide any more. They eventually returned home and Ryan entered the parked TARDIS, discovering that the creature was, in fact, a reconnaissance scout Dalek that had taken control of Lin. Ryan joined the Doctor in tracking it down to a farm.

The Dalek eventually let go of Lin and Ryan helped take her back to the TARDIS. After the Dalek rebuilt a casing for itself before meeting the Doctor and taking off to summon a fleet to Earth, the group picked up Graham and Aaron and went to corner the Dalek. They used a microwave owned by Aaron to melt its casing, but the Dalek escaped and took control of Aaron. When the Doctor attempted to jettison it out of the TARDIS and into a supernova, Aaron nearly got sucked out too, and Ryan finally proclaimed that he loved him and forgave him, helping save Aaron's life. Returning Aaron, Lin and Mitch to their lives, Ryan promised to call Aaron when he next returned and continued his adventures with the Doctor.

Departing the Doctor
In "Revolution of the Daleks," after spending ten months on Earth with no sign of the Doctor, Graham, Ryan and Yaz investigated Daleks created by their old enemy Jack Robertson. During these ten months, Ryan had resumed a normal life with his friends and continued his reconciliation with his father. Having been rescued from prison by Captain Jack Harkness, the Doctor returned to aid her companions in defending the Earth once more. Ryan worked with Graham and Jack to destroy the Dalek ship summoned by the Doctor to deal with the Daleks on Earth. In the aftermath, Ryan chose to resume a normal life on Earth and Graham chose to join him to remain with his grandson. The Doctor provided the two men with their own psychic paper as a parting gift and Ryan and Graham decided to continue investigating alien events and protecting the Earth together. Before going to investigate possible alien sightings, Graham tried to help Ryan ride a bicycle again as he and Grace had done before they met the Doctor. The two men saw a vision of Grace smiling at them as they bonded.

Appearances

Television
Ryan Sinclair is introduced in the eleventh series premiere, "The Woman Who Fell to Earth".

Ryan is a 19-year-old living in Sheffield, England who is training to be an electrical engineer while working part-time as a warehouse worker. He was raised by his paternal grandmother, Grace O'Brien, who recently married his step-grandfather, Graham O'Brien. Grace worked as a nurse, and met Graham while he was undergoing chemotherapy for cancer, about three years before they met the Doctor. Ryan and Yasmin Khan were in primary school together, though at the time they didn't know each other very closely.

Ryan has dyspraxia, a coordination difference that impacts his motor skills. Though his symptoms are relatively mild and high-functioning, it affects his sense of balance to the point that he finds tasks like riding a bicycle extremely difficult.

His father, Aaron, a marine electrical engineer, made an appearance in the 2019 New Year Special. Aaron has been absent most of Ryan's life since the death of his mother, and was also absent for Grace's funeral.

Other media
In September 2018, three Series 11 tie-in novels were announced, all of which feature Ryan Sinclair – The Good Doctor, Molten Heart and Combat Magicks. Ryan is depicted on the cover of Molten Heart.

Casting and development
On 22 October 2017, it was announced that Cole had been cast as a companion in the eleventh series of Doctor Who, and would appear alongside Jodie Whittaker in 2018.

On 26 September 2018, following the premiere of The Woman Who Fell to Earth, the fact that Ryan would have dyspraxia was officially revealed by the media. Showrunner Chris Chibnall explained: “It's a relatively common thing among kids, so I think it's important to see that heroes come in all shapes and sizes.” Considerable research was undertaken with the Dyspraxia Foundation to ensure an accurate portrayal of the condition.

Cole departed the role in the special "Revolution of the Daleks".

References

External links

Doctor Who companions
Fictional Black British people
Television characters introduced in 2018
Fictional English people
Fictional people from Yorkshire
Fictional characters with neurological or psychological disorders
Fictional people from the 20th-century
Fictional people from the 21st-century
British male characters in television